Czerwonka may refer to:

 Czerwonka, Łódź Voivodeship (central Poland)
 Czerwonka, Sokółka County in Podlaskie Voivodeship (north-east Poland)
 Czerwonka, Suwałki County in Podlaskie Voivodeship (north-east Poland)
 Czerwonka, Kozienice County in Masovian Voivodeship (east-central Poland)
 Czerwonka, Maków County in Masovian Voivodeship (east-central Poland)
 Czerwonka, Sokołów County in Masovian Voivodeship (east-central Poland)
 Czerwonka, Węgrów County in Masovian Voivodeship (east-central Poland)
 Czerwonka, Koło County in Greater Poland Voivodeship (west-central Poland)
 Czerwonka, Słupca County in Greater Poland Voivodeship (west-central Poland)
 Czerwonka, Ełk County in Warmian-Masurian Voivodeship (north Poland)
 Czerwonka, Olsztyn County in Warmian-Masurian Voivodeship (north Poland)
 Gmina Czerwonka, a rural gmina (administrative district) in Maków County, Masovian Voivodeship
 Czerwonka-Folwark, a village in the administrative district of Gmina
 Czerwonka-Gozdów, a village in the administrative district of Gmina Firlej
 Czerwonka-Parcel, a village in the administrative district of Gmina
 Czerwonka Poleśna, a village in the administrative district of Gmina
 Czerwonka-Wieś, a village in the administrative district of Gmina Sochaczew
 Červonka in Latvia

People with the surname
Drew Czerwonka
Natalia Czerwonka (born 1988), Polish long track speed skater

Polish-language surnames